Rhythm and Stealth is the second studio album by Leftfield, released on 20 September 1999. It reached number 1 on the UK Albums Chart. It was nominated for the 2000 Mercury Music Prize.

Critical reception

Matt Hendrickson of Rolling Stone said, "The album's jumble of epic sounds is a blessing and a curse: Rhythm and Stealth never develops a sustained, full-on groove, but it makes for a mind-melding headphone adventure." John Bush of AllMusic said, "Leftfield has moved on with a grace and mastery of production seldom seen in the dance world."

NME named it the 24th best album of 1999.

Track listing

Personnel
Credits adapted from liner notes.

 Neil Barnes – production
 Paul Daley – production
 Nick Rapaccioli – production (6, 7)
 Roots Manuva – vocals (1)
 Cheshire Cat – vocals (3)
 Afrika Bambaataa – vocals (6)
 Nicole Willis – vocals (8)
 Rino – vocals (10)
 Jono Gallagher – tape operation
 Nick Baxter – tape operation
 Ady Stockwell – tape operation
 Adam Wren – engineering
 Paul Solomons – mastering
 Blue Source – art direction
 Toby McFarlan Pond – photography

Charts

Weekly charts

Year-end charts

References

External links
 
 

1999 albums
Leftfield albums